Salvia umbratica is an annual or biennial plant that is native to Anhui, Gansu, Hebei, Hubei, Shaanxi, and Shanxi provinces in China, found growing on hillsides and valleys at  elevation.

Inflorescences are widely spaced 2-flowered verticillasters in terminal and axillary racemes, with a  blue-purple or purple corolla.

Notes

umbratica
Flora of China